Sonora State Highway 147 (Carretera Estatal 147) is a highway in the south of the Mexican state of Sonora.

It runs from Navojoa to Bacobampo.

References

147